The 2014 West Coast Conference women's basketball tournament was held March 6–11, 2014, at Orleans Arena in the Las Vegas Valley community of Paradise, Nevada. This was the sixth consecutive year the WCC Tournament took place in Vegas after the WCC and the Orleans Hotel and Casino, which operates the arena, reached a 3-year extension to keep the tournament in Vegas through 2016.

Format
With the addition of the University of the Pacific, bringing the WCC to 10 members, the conference adopted a more traditional tournament format. Under the new format, the top 6 seeds receive a bye out of the first round while the 7 seed plays the 10 seed and the 8 seed plays the 9 seed. The first round begins on a Thursday. BYUtv airs all games, except for the championship, and simulcasts them on the WCC's streaming video outlet, TheW.tv. The tournament championship airs on ESPNU.

The former second round is now the quarterfinal round. It takes place on Friday and has the 1 seed playing the winner of the 8/9 game and the 2 seed playing the winner of the 7/10 game. The quarterfinals also feature the 3 seed playing the 6 seed, and the 4 seed playing the 5 seed.

After two off-days, the semifinals take place on Monday with the winner of 1/8/9 playing the winner of 4/5 and the winner of 2/7/10 playing the winner of 3/6.

The championship takes place on Tuesday and features the semifinal winners. As in the recent past, the championship game continues to be broadcast on ESPNU.

Seeds

Schedule

Bracket and scores

Game Summaries

Pepperdine vs. Santa Clara
Series History: Pepperdine leads 34-33
Broadcasters: Spencer Linton & Kristen Kozlowski

Loyola Marymount vs. San Francisco
Series History: Series even 33-33
Broadcasters: Spencer Linton & Kristen Kozlowski

Pacific vs. Portland
Series History: Portland leads 7-3
Broadcasters: Spencer Linton & Kristen Kozlowski
This game would become the final game for Portland coach Jim Sollars, who would retire after 28 seasons. During his post-game press conference, Sollars would thank his wife for all the hardships he put her through. His exact words, "Before I go I have to say one thing… I always forget the most important person in this whole thing. My wife has been through approximately 40 years of weekends with 13 beautiful women and all the complaining that I bring home. And I cannot thank her enough."

Pepperdine vs. BYU
Series History: BYU leads 7-2
Broadcasters: Spencer Linton & Kristen Kozlowski

Gonzaga vs. San Francisco
Series History: Gonzaga leads 33-24
Broadcasters: Dave McCann & Blaine Fowler

San Diego vs. Saint Mary's
Series History: Saint Mary's leads 38-27
Broadcasters: Dave McCann & Blaine Fowler

Gonzaga vs. Saint Mary's
Series History: Gonzaga leads 34-25
Broadcasters: Dave McCann & Blaine Fowler

BYU vs. Pacific
Series History: BYU leads 6-2
Broadcasters: Dave McCann & Blaine Fowler

WCC Championship: BYU vs. Gonzaga
Series History: Gonzaga leads 8-6
Broadcasters: Dave Flemming & Sean Farnham (ESPNU)
Dave McCann & Blaine Fowler (BYU Radio)

All tournament team
Tournament MVP in bold.

See also
2013–14 NCAA Division I women's basketball season
West Coast Conference men's basketball tournament
2014 West Coast Conference men's basketball tournament
2013–14 West Coast Conference women's basketball season
West Coast Conference women's basketball tournament

References

External links

Tournament
West Coast Conference women's basketball tournament
West Coast Conference women's basketball tournament
West Coast Conference women's basketball tournament
Basketball competitions in the Las Vegas Valley
College basketball tournaments in Nevada
Women's sports in Nevada
College sports tournaments in Nevada